Tyspanodes suasalis is a moth in the family Crambidae. It was described by Herbert Druce in 1899. It is found in Veracruz, Mexico.

The forewings and hindwings are semihyaline yellowish white, the former slightly darker near the apex.

References

Moths described in 1899
Spilomelinae